This is a timeline of the 18th century in philosophy

Events 
The Age of Enlightenment

Publications 
The Lives of the Ancient Philosophers (London, 1702)
Mary Astell, Moderation Truly Stated (London, 1704)
 Giambattista Vico, The New Science (1725)
 David Hume, A Treatise of Human Nature (1739-1740)

Births 
Jonathan Edwards was born in 1703.
 2 April 1725 - Giacomo Casanova (died 1798)

Deaths 
John Locke died in 1704.

See also
List of centuries in philosophy

References 
Aaron Garrett. The Routledge Companion to Eighteenth Century Philosophy. Routledge. London and New York. 2014. Google Books 
Knud Haakonssen (ed). The Cambridge History of Eighteenth-Century Philosophy. Cambridge University Press. 2006. Volume 1.
Lewis White Beck (ed). Eighteenth-Century Philosophy. (Readings in the History of Philosophy). The Free Press. 1966. 
Jing-Xing Huang and C S Huang. Philosophy, Philology, and Politics in Eighteenth-Century China. Cambridge University Press. 1995. First paperback edition. 2002. Google Books.

Philosophy by century
 
Early Modern philosophy